Errant Husbands (German: Kyritz - Pyritz) is a 1931 German comedy film directed by Carl Heinz Wolff and starring Max Adalbert, Hansi Arnstaedt and Henry Bender.

Cast
 Max Adalbert as Dr. Peter Liezow, Bürgermeister
 Hansi Arnstaedt as Henriette
 Henry Bender as Anton Piepenberg, Apotheker
 Magda Elgen as 	Tusnelda
 Paul Hörbiger as Otto Rux, Weinhändler
 Lotte Stein as Ulrike
 Harry Halm as 	Fritz Ebert
 Gustl Gstettenbaur as 	Emil, Lietzows Neffe 
 Otti Dietze as	Frau Soltmann, Pensionsinhaberin
 Lilian Ellis as 	Anni, ihre Nichte
 Eugen Rex as 	Wilhelm Klobig, Stadtkapellmeister
 Paul Westermeier as Waldemar Schwefelmann, Schneider
 Paul Heidemann as 	Emil Nauke, Friseur
 Hermann Picha as	Hausdiener

References

Bibliography 
 Churton, Tobias. Aleister Crowley: The Beast in Berlin: Art, Sex, and Magick in the Weimar Republic. Simon and Schuster, 2014.
 Klaus, Ulrich J. Deutsche Tonfilme: Jahrgang 1931. Klaus-Archiv, 2006.

External links 
 

1931 films
Films of the Weimar Republic
German comedy films
1931 comedy films
1930s German-language films
Films directed by Carl Heinz Wolff
German black-and-white films
1930s German films